This is a list of notable graduates of Saint Peter's University (formerly Saint Peter's College) in Jersey City, New Jersey.

Notable alumni

Academics
 Jack Bogdanski, professor of law at Lewis & Clark Law School
 George J. Borjas, Robert W. Scrivner Professor of Economics and Social Policy at the Harvard Kennedy School

Arts & entertainment
 Will Durant, 1968 Pulitzer Prize for General Non-Fiction and the 1977 Presidential Medal of Freedom recipient
 Ken Jennings, 1979 Drama Desk Award for Outstanding Featured Actor in a Musical recipient
 George Khoury, notable writer and interviewer in the field of comic books
 Renee Sebastian, Filipino-American soul-infused pop and R&B singer and songwriter
 Rory Farrell (The Joe Budden Podcast and New Rory & Mal Podcast)

Business

Government

Law
 Thomas Francis Meaney, former Judge on the United States District Court for the District of New Jersey
 Peter G. Sheridan, Judge on the United States District Court for the District of New Jersey
 Reginald Stanton '56, former Judge of the New Jersey Superior Court; Saint Peter’s first and only Rhodes Scholar
 Chester J. Straub, Senior Circuit Judge of the United States Court of Appeals for the Second Circuit

Journalism
 John Henning, award-winning TV and radio news reporter in Boston, Massachusetts
 Thomas O'Toole, award-winning reporter for The Washington Post and other newspapers

Science and medicine
 Nicholas J. Cifarelli, physician known for starting the first Bioethics Advisory Committee in the United States
 Robert G. Lahita, ’67, chairman of medicine, St. Joseph's Healthcare System
 Joseph McGinn, pioneer of minimally invasive cardiac bypass surgery; medical director of the Heart Institute of Staten Island

Sports
 Frank Brooks, former MLB relief pitcher
 Keydren Clark, Two-time NCAA basketball scoring champion and seventh all-time leading scorer in NCAA history.
 Doug Edert, breakout star of the Peacocks' 2022 NCAA tournament run (transferred to Bryant University after that season)
 Bill Foxen, former MLB pitcher
 Bob Hurley, Naismith Memorial Basketball Hall of Fame basketball coach at St. Anthony High School in Jersey City, New Jersey
 KC Ndefo, another key player in the Peacocks' 2022 NCAA tournament run (transferred to Seton Hall University after that season)
 Víctor Santos, former MLB relief pitcher
 Murphy Wiredu, professional soccer player
Bernard Cicirelli, 1st St. Peter's College basketball All-American 1954, inaugural inductee in college's Athletic Hall of Fame 1981, and 2013 inductee into the MAAC Honor Roll Exhibition at Naismith Memorial Basketball Hall of Fame

References
https://maacsports.com/hof.aspx